Lathyrus vernus, the spring vetchling, spring pea, or spring vetch, is a species of flowering herbaceous perennial plant in the genus Lathyrus, native to forests of Europe and Siberia. It forms a dense clump of pointed leaves with purple flowers in spring, shading to a greenish-blue with age.

This species, and the cultivar 'Alboroseus', have gained the Royal Horticultural Society's Award of Garden Merit.

Description
Lathyrus vernus is a perennial plant with an upright stem without wings. The leaves are alternate with short stalks and large, wide stipules. The leaf blades are pinnate with two to four pairs of ovate tapering  leaflets with blunt tips, entire margins and no tendrils. These have five sepals and five petals and are irregular. The uppermost petal is known as the "standard", the lateral two as the "wings" and the lowest two are joined to form the "keel". There are ten stamens and a single carpel. This plant flowers early in the year, in May and June. It can be distinguished from bitter vetch (L. linifolius) and black pea (L. niger) by the breadth of its ovate leaflets. It does not wither after flowering but continues to grow until autumn.

Distribution and habitat
Lathyrus vernus is native to Europe and parts of northern Asia. Its typical habitat is broad-leaved woodland, forest margins, plantations and clearings.

References

Gallery

External links
USDA PLANTS Profile

vernus
Flora of Europe
Flora of Serbia
Flora of Russia
Flora of Siberia
Plants described in 1753
Taxa named by Carl Linnaeus